Frank Henry Fleer (1860November 1, 1921) was an American confectioner who is thought to have developed the first bubble gum. Fleer founded the Frank H. Fleer Corporation in 1919 as a gum manufacturer. Fleer's original formulation, called Blibber-Blubber, was never marketed to the public. It was not until 1928 that Walter Diemer, an accountant in Fleer's company, was able to refine the formulation and became marketed by Fleer's company as Dubble Bubble.

Fleer's company also went on to be innovators in the baseball card business, adding trading cards in 1923.

Death
Fleer died, aged 65, of a stroke at his Davidson County, North Carolina residence in 1921. He is buried at West Laurel Hill Cemetery Belmont Section, Lot 58 in Bala Cynwyd, Pennsylvania.

References

1860 births
1921 deaths
Businesspeople from Philadelphia
19th-century American businesspeople
20th-century American businesspeople
Confectioners